The 2011–12 Turkish Ice Hockey Super League season was the 20th season of the Turkish Ice Hockey Super League, the top level of ice hockey in Turkey. 11 teams participated in the league, and Başkent Yıldızları Spor Kulübü won the championship.

Regular season

Group A

Group B

Playoffs

3rd place game 
Izmir BB GSK defeated Erzurum Gençlik SK placing third.

Final 
Başkent Yıldızları SK defeated Kocaeli B.B. Kağıt SK becoming league champion.

External links 
 Off. Turkish Ice Hockey Federation

TBHSL
Turkish Ice Hockey Super League seasons
TBHSL